Lamos may refer to:

 Lamos (river), a river in Cilicia, now called Limonlu Çayı in Mersin Province, Turkey
 Lamos (Cilicia), a town of ancient Cilicia and Isauria, Turkey
 Lamos (city), another ancient settlement and archaeological site in Cilicia, Turkey
 Lamos, a small river on the summit of Mount Helicon according to Pausanias
 Lamos, a son fathered on Omphale by Heracles according to Diodorus Siculus and Ovid
 Lamos, a name associated with Telepylus, the city of the Laestrygonians, in the Odyssey
 LAMOS (League Aiming to Menace and Overthrow Spies), a villainous organization in the television series Totally Spies!

See also 
 Lamus (disambiguation)

Greek words and phrases